The Maurice "Rocket" Richard Trophy, also known as the Rocket Richard Trophy, is awarded annually to the leading goal scorer in the National Hockey League (NHL). First won by Teemu Selanne, it is currently held by Auston Matthews, who scored 60 goals during the 2021–22 NHL season.

History

It is one of the newest of the NHL's trophies and is named in honour of the legendary right winger Maurice "Rocket" Richard, who spent his eighteen-season career with the Canadiens. He led the NHL in goal scoring five times and was the first NHL player to reach the 500-goal milestone. In , Richard became the first player in NHL history to score 50 goals in one season, doing so in just 50 games, the latter feat achieved by only four other players since then.

The winner of the Art Ross Trophy, given to the NHL's leading points scorer, often also wins the Hart Memorial Trophy as the league's most valuable player. Eleven players won the Hart in the same season in which they led the league in goals before the Richard Trophy was first awarded.

Unlike the Art Ross Trophy, there are no tiebreakers for the Richard Trophy. As a result, it is possible for several players to share the award, such as when the  season featured a three-way tie between 41-goal scorers Jarome Iginla, Ilya Kovalchuk, and Rick Nash. The second time there was a tie for this award was in the  season, when both Sidney Crosby and Steven Stamkos scored 51 goals each to win this award. In the shortened  season, there was a tie between Ovechkin and David Pastrnak, though Ovechkin played in two fewer games than Pastrnak. Rick Nash is the youngest player to have won the trophy, being 19 years old upon receipt. 

Only five other players (Pavel Bure, Jarome Iginla, Steven Stamkos, Sidney Crosby, and Auston Matthews with two trophies each) have won it more than once.

Winners

Key
(#) Wins including leading goal scorers prior to the trophy's formal introduction
* Season shortened by the 2012–13 NHL lockout
** Season shortened by the COVID-19 pandemic

See also
List of past NHL scoring leaders
List of NHL scoring leaders by season

References
General
Maurice Rocket Richard Trophy info at records.NHL.com
Maurice Richard Trophy winners at NHL.com

Specific

National Hockey League trophies and awards